Choices is an album by American jazz saxophonist Dewey Redman featuring performances recorded in 1992 for the Enja label. The album features the recording debut of Redman's son Joshua Redman.

Reception
The Allmusic review by Thom Jurek awarded the album 4 stars stating "Redman himself is in fine form, playing with all of the deep, steamy lyricism he showcased so brilliantly with Ornette Coleman and in Old and New Dreams, but there is something else too, as evidenced by the track selection, and that is a new reverence for the tradition. Redman was always a melodic player, even in his most fiery avant encounters, but his love for jazz tradition, particularly its formalist considerations, was never really apparent until now".

Track listing
All compositions by Dewey Redman except as indicated
 "Le Clit" - 9:09 
 "Everything Happens to Me" (Tom Adair, Matt Dennis) - 10:27 
 "O'Besso" - 14:09 
 "Imagination" (Johnny Burke, Jimmy Van Heusen) - 8:15 
 "For Mo" - 13:25 
Recorded at Tom Tedesco Studio in New Jersey on July 29 & 30, 1992

Personnel
Dewey Redman - tenor saxophone, alto saxophone, musette
Joshua Redman - tenor saxophone
Cameron Brown - bass
Leon Parker - drums

References

Enja Records albums
Dewey Redman albums
1992 albums